"Fire" (Part 1)  is the season premiere of the fourth season of the American police drama television series Homicide: Life on the Street. It originally aired on NBC on October 20, 1995. The episode was written by Julie Martin (from a story by Tom Fontana and Henry Bromell) and was directed by Tim Hunter. The two-part story centres on Pembleton and Bayliss' investigation into a pair of arson-related homicides, and introduces a new regular character, Arson Squad detective Mike Kellerman (played by Reed Diamond), who subsequently transfers to Homicide and partners with Det. Meldrick Lewis. This episode also flagged the permanent departure of regular characters Stanley Bolander (Ned Beatty) and Beau Felton (Daniel Baldwin).

Plot summary  
As the episode opens, Kay Howard and Munch are on the station house rooftop, discussing recent events at a police convention in New York, where Bolander and Felton were among a group of 100 drunken police who ran amok at their hotel, and that this misconduct has earned them a 22-week suspension. As they talk, Howard notices a fire in the distance and they argue over its exact location. The action then cuts to the fire (in an abandoned box warehouse) where fire-fighters discover a charred body and summon the Homicide Squad. Pembleton and Bayliss arrive to investigate the death, and meet Arson Squad detective Mike Kellerman. He and Pembleton clash over Kellerman's assumptions about the victim's identity and manner of death. Believing the arson was for financial reasons, Kellerman meets an informant the next morning and pressures him to provide the name of the arsonist. Pembleton and Bayliss go to the pathologist for the post-mortem results, only to find that Kellerman has been there ahead of them. Hoping to link the dead boy to missing persons records, Pembleton visits Missing Persons, where he encounters his nemesis, Det. Roger Gaffney.

At the station house, Howard and Munch both declare that they will sit for the Sergeant's exam in hopes of gaining a promotion and the squad begins to stake odds on the outcome.

Capt. Russert and Col. Barnfather discuss the problems in the squad. Barnfather pressures Russert to improve the squad's cleanup rate, hinting that he might replace Giardello for being unable to control his detectives, and that he will hold Russert responsible for Giardello's "screw-ups". Kellerman visits the squad room to discuss the case with Bayliss and Pembleton, telling them he believes the building's owner, Matthew Rowland, is responsible for the recent fire, and for several other arson attacks on properties Rowland owns. While they are arguing, Lewis informs the detectives that uniformed officers guarding the crime scene have apprehended a teenage girl, Lisa Denardi, who was found poking around in the ruined building. When questioned, she reveals that she and her boyfriend regularly met there at night to have sex, and that they kept a sleeping bag there; from her evidence, the detectives conclude that the body is that of Lisa's 16-year-old boyfriend, Mark Landry. Kellerman visits a woman claiming to have information about the fire, but when he enters her house she strips naked and tries to seduce him so Kellerman hurriedly leaves.

Bayliss visits the lab, where he meets up with Kellerman, who explains that tests show that the fire was started with gasoline. Coincidentally, back at the station house, Pembleton receives an anonymous phone tipoff about the location of the gas can supposedly used to start the fire. The mystery informant, whom we only partially see, declares that it "sucks" that the boy has been killed in the fire; his information leads Pembleton to the gas can. Meanwhile, Bayliss and Kellerman visit the building's owner, Rowland, and confront him about the arson attacks, but an infuriated Rowland phones contacts at City Hall, and as a result of his pressure, Russert meets Kellerman to explain that Rowland was actually in negotiation to sell the building to the city, and she orders Kellerman to leave Rowland alone.

Fingerprint evidence on the gas can leads to a man called Calvin Jones, so Pembleton and Bayliss go to question him. When Jones tries to flee, Pembleton freezes, but he soon recovers and helps Bayliss catch Jones, who eventually proves to be a serial 'confessor' with no real connection to the crime. After the arrest, Bayliss expresses concern about Frank's state of mind (alluding to Frank's recent ordeal at the hands of the stalker) and Pembleton reveals that his wife is pregnant. At Giardello's insistence, Pembleton canvasses Landry's high school, but he draws a blank, with all information indicating that the dead boy was a 'regular' kid with no enemies. Bayliss reveals that the girl's father (who had been a suspect) also has an alibi. Kellerman offers a tentative theory that the arsonist might be someone obsessed with fire.

Russert visits Giardello's office to ask about the progress of the investigation. They begin to discuss the staffing problems stemming from the suspension of Bolander and Felton, and Giardello reveals that Russert's affair with Felton is common knowledge in the squad. They begin to argue, but they are interrupted by news of another arson attack. When Pembleton, Bayliss and Kellerman arrive at the scene, they are told that a body has been spotted inside the burning building, and Kellerman admits that Pembleton's theory about Landry's death may have been right.

Production

Cultural references 
When the mystery informant calls Pembleton with the tipoff about the fire, he turns up the volume of his car radio, which is playing the Jimi Hendrix version of the Bob Dylan song "All Along The Watchtower", and this music carries through the subsequent sequence.

References 

1.  Kalat, David P. (1998). Homicide: Life on the Street: The Unofficial Companion. Los Angeles, California: Renaissance Books. p. 102. .

2.  Levinson, Barry. (2003) (Audio commentary). Homicide Life on the Street - The Seasons 1 & 2. [DVD]. A&E Home Video.

Homicide: Life on the Street (season 4) episodes
1995 American television episodes